Étienne Manac'h (later known as Étienne Manoël Manac'h;  February 3, 1910 in Plouigneau, Brittany – 1992) was a French career diplomat and author.

Life

Early life
Manac'h attended Morlaix Collège from 1922 until 1925, and following the family's move to Paris attended the Lycée Buffon, where he received his baccalauréat in 1929. After the classe préparatoire at the Lycée Louis-le Grand he studied philosophy at the Sorbonne, graduating in 1931 and obtaining his Diplôme d'études supérieures in 1934. After teaching in France and military service, he went on to teach philosophy and French literature at Galatasaray High School, Istanbul between 1938 and 1942.

Diplomatic career
In 1941 he started working for the Free French movement in Turkey, heading operations there from 1942, and was charged with developing clandestine contacts to members of the Résistance working in Vichy French embassies in the Balkan States. From 1945 - 1951 he was stationed in Czechoslovakia, first as Embassy Secretary in Prague, then as consul general in Bratislava. Along with other Western diplomats, he was expelled from the country in 1951, allegedly for espionage and support for "elements hostile to the regime". Between 1951 and 1969 he held various posts, including director of the cabinet of the socialist Ministre d'Etat Guy Mollet (from 1958–1959) and director of Asie-Océanie à l'Administration Centrale (Central Administration for Far Eastern Affairs) at the foreign ministry (Quai d'Orsay) from 1960–1969, where he was influential in setting up negotiations between Washington and Hanoi during the Vietnam War. From 1969-1975, Manac'h served as French ambassador to the People's Republic of China.

Controversy surrounding possible activity as a Soviet agent 
Manac'h was a member of the French communist party from 1934 to 1939, thus leaving himself vulnerable to accusations of espionage (after the war he became a socialist and was a member of the SFIO from c. 1959 to 1969). During the Second World War he had official contacts to the Soviet secret service and later as a diplomat he was responsible for relations with the Soviet Union and other Eastern European countries.

Later life
In 1975 he retired to Pont-Aven in his native Brittany, buying the house Lezaven, where the painter Paul Gauguin had his studio. He died there, 17 years later.

References

Bibliography
Compagnons d’Europe / Hervé Kerven [pseudon.]. - Paris, Julliard, 1949
Mémoires d'Extrême Asie / Étienne M. Manac'h (3 vol., Paris, Fayard, 1977–1982)
Emilio: récit à voix basse / Étienne M. Manac'h ; [avec la collab. de Nella Masutti]. - Paris, Plon, 1990.
Journal intime 1926-1939: Paris, Berlin, Moscou, Istanbul / Étienne Manac'h. - Morlaix, Skol Vreizh, 2008.
Journal intime 1939-1951: De la France libre à la Guerre froide / Étienne Manac'h. - Morlaix, Skol Vreizh, 2010.

Further reading 
Power and Protest by Jeremi Suri, Harvard University Press 2005, p. 226
The Indochinese Experience of the French and the Americans by Arthur J. Dommen, Indiana University Press, p. 681
"Deux étudiants "Coloniaux" à Paris à l'Aube des années trente" by Jean-François Sirinelli, Vingtième Siècle, 1988

Ambassadors of France to China
1910 births
1992 deaths
Lycée Buffon alumni
People from Finistère